Plantago subnuda is a species of plantain known by the common name tall coastal plantain. It is native to western North America from the west coast of the United States to west-central Mexico, where it grows in wet and moist habitat types, often in coastal areas, such as marshland. It is a perennial herb producing few oval leaves around a thick caudex. The broad smooth-edged or slightly toothed leaves may be up to 40 centimeters long. The stemlike inflorescences grow erect to a maximum height near half a meter. Atop the peduncle of the inflorescence is a dense cylindrical spike of many tiny flowers. Each flower has a corolla of ephemeral petals about 3 millimeters long.

External links
Jepson Manual Treatment
Photo gallery

subnuda
Flora of North America